Cornwall R.L.F.C. is an English professional rugby league team based in Penryn, Cornwall. They will play their home matches at Penryn RFC's Memorial Ground.

History

2019–20: Ottawa Aces

It was first announced in March 2019 that a consortium from Canada, led by Toronto Wolfpack founder Eric Perez, had purchased the Rugby Football League membership of club Hemel Stags and planned to relocate their licence to Canada.

More due diligence took place during 2019 to decide if the club was ready to join League 1 for the 2020 season along with the New York City Rugby League, however at the end of July 2019 it was announced that the club would not enter the league in 2020 and would instead work towards joining the league in 2021.

On 9 March 2020, Ottawa announced they would push back their debut season and enter League 1 in 2021. However, due to travel restrictions between Canada and the United Kingdom resulting from the COVID-19 pandemic, the Aces and the RFL agreed to defer entry to the League 1 another year again, until 2022.

Come March 2021, it was announced Ottawa would compete in the newly founded North America Rugby League along with the Toronto Wolfpack, however Perez said the club still expected to play in League 1 in 2022 and suggested the club could play as a 2nd team in the NARL.

On 22 October 2021, it was announced that Ottawa Aces would relocate back to the United Kingdom permanently due the "unstable operating environment" of running a club in the British leagues from Canada during a pandemic. They would also withdraw from the NARL effectively disbanding as the Ottawa Aces.

2021–present: Relocation to Cornwall

On 2 November 2021 the club was officially relocated to Penryn, Cornwall and rebranded as Cornwall R.L.F.C.. The club will begin play in RFL League 1, the third tier of the British rugby league system.

On 8 December 2021 it was announced that Neil Kelly had been appointed as head coach, and Anthony Mullally was the first player signing

They will be sponsored by Sedulo for the 2021 season.

Players

Current squad
Squad for 2022 RFL League 1;

Coaches
 Mike Abbot 2022-Present
 Neil Kelly 2021–2022

Seasons

See also
Rugby League in Cornwall
Cornish Rebels

References

External links
 

English rugby league teams
2021 establishments in England
Rugby clubs established in 2021
Rugby league teams in Cornwall